West Ukrainian football derby was an unofficial competition as part of the Ukrainian Premier League that consisted of series of rivalries in the region of western Ukraine.

History
This derby started with the establishment of the Ukrainian Premier League in 1992. Most of the time the clubs that performed the best in the derby were far from being a successful season overall in the League. Karpaty, being the best club in the region, often had a difficult time to prove themselves as such with their regional neighbors. The derby faded away to lower leagues by 2001. After 2001 new participants such as Zakarpattia and Lviv replaced other teams in the rivalry. From the initial top level participants only Karpaty and Volyn continue to perform in the premiers.

Participants

1992-2001
FC Bukovyna Chernivtsi
FC Karpaty Lviv
FC Nyva Ternopil
Nyva Vinnytsia
FC Prykarpattia Ivano-Frankivsk
Temp Shepetivka
FC Volyn Lutsk
FC Veres Rivne

After 2001
FC Karpaty Lviv
Lviv
FC Volyn Lutsk
Zakarpattia Uzhhorod

FC Nyva Vinnytsia and FC Temp Shepetivka have considered to be as teams from western part of country, yet, they are beyond the Zbruch river and thus really are outside the region. FC Lviv and FC Zakarpattia Uzhhorod came later.

Archive

1992

1992-93

1993-94

1994-95

See also
 Ukrainian Premier League
 Ukrainian derby

External links
 Archives 

Ukrainian football derbies
Football in the regions of Ukraine
FC Karpaty Lviv
FC Volyn Lutsk